Lars-Erik Persson (born 24 September 1944) is a Swedish/Norwegian professor in mathematics, known for his works in Fourier analysis, function spaces, inequalities, interpolation theory and related problems connected to convexity and quasi-monotone functions.

Persson comes from the small village Svanabyn in Dorotea community, Sweden. He received his PhD degree in mathematics at Umeå University in 1974. In 1975 he was employed as associate professor in mathematics at Luleå University of Technology (LTU), and was appointed full professor in 1994. Since 2019 he is professor emeritus there. Before his professor appointment at LTU, he was appointed as full professor at UiT The Arctic University of Norway, Campus Narvik (previously Narvik University College) in 1992. He still works as professor of mathematics at the same university.  He was also appointed as honorary professor at L.N.Gumilyov Eurasian National University, Kazakhstan in 2005. Persson has also worked as a part-time professor at Uppsala University, where he is now professor emeritus. For a shorter period he taught at Lund University, Sweden, as professor in mathematics on the chair of professor Jaak Peetre. He was appointed as senior professor at Karlstad university, Sweden, in 2019.

Persson has been author or co-author of around 320 papers in Journals and 16 books. He is editor of seven international Journals. He has been President of the Swedish Mathematical Society and also ordinary member from 1995 (secretary during 1995–2002) of the National Committee of Mathematics equipped with the Royal Swedish Academy of Sciences. He was ordinary member for six years of the board NT-R (Mathematics and Technical Mathematics) at the Swedish Research Council, a government agency that distributes the funding for basic research of the highest quality in Sweden. In 2010 and from 2012 to 2014 he was chairman of the board. He initiated and was the first director of Center of Interdisciplinary Mathematics (CIM) at Uppsala University. See his homepage at UiT The Arctic University of Norway and his homepage at Karlstad University;Sweden – See also international homepage of Lars-Erik Persson

Persson has been invited as guest researcher to universities in numerous countries. In November 2015 he was invited to Collège de France by Fields medalist Pierre-Louis Lions. International conferences were arranged and a journal issue was published in his honor.

References

Living people
Swedish mathematicians
1944 births
Umeå University alumni
Academic staff of the Luleå University of Technology